The Lavallette School District is a community public school district that serves students in kindergarten through eighth grade from Lavallette, in Ocean County, New Jersey, United States.

As of the 2020–21 school year, the district, comprised of one school, had an enrollment of 156 students and 16.3 classroom teachers (on an FTE basis), for a student–teacher ratio of 9.6:1. In the 2016–17 school year, Lavallette was tied as the 23rd-smallest enrollment of any school district in the state, with 146 students.

The district is classified by the New Jersey Department of Education as being in District Factor Group "DE", the fifth-highest of eight groupings. District Factor Groups organize districts statewide to allow comparison by common socioeconomic characteristics of the local districts. From lowest socioeconomic status to highest, the categories are A, B, CD, DE, FG, GH, I and J.

Students in public school for ninth through twelfth grades attend Point Pleasant Beach High School in Point Pleasant Beach, as part of a sending/receiving relationship with the Point Pleasant Beach School District, together with students from Bay Head and Mantoloking. As of the 2020–21 school year, the high school had an enrollment of 382 students and 36.9 classroom teachers (on an FTE basis), for a student–teacher ratio of 10.4:1.

History
In 2017, the Appellate Division affirmed a decision by the New Jersey Department of Education allowing students from Seaside Park the option of attending school for grades K-6 in either the Toms River Regional Schools or in Lavallette under the terms of a dual sending/receiving relationship. The Lavallette district had actively supported the proposal when the original petition was submitted in 2015.

School
Schools in the district are:
Lavallette Elementary School, which had an enrollment of 156 students as of the 2020–21 school year.

Administration
Core members of the district's administration are:
Dr. Lisa Gleason, Superintendent
Patricia Christopher, Business Administrator / Board Secretary

Board of education
The district's board of education is comprised of five members who set policy and oversee the fiscal and educational operation of the district through its administration. As a Type II school district, the board's trustees are elected directly by voters to serve three-year terms of office on a staggered basis, with either one or two seats up for election each year held (since 2012) as part of the November general election. The board appoints a superintendent to oversee the district's day-to-day operations and a business administrator to supervise the business functions of the district.

References

External links
Lavallette Elementary School
 
School Data for the Lavallette Elementary School, National Center for Education Statistics

Lavallette, New Jersey
New Jersey District Factor Group DE
School districts in Ocean County, New Jersey
Public K–8 schools in New Jersey